Ramwapur is a village in Basti district in the state of Uttar Pradesh, India. The village is administered by a Sarpanch who is an elected representative of village as per constitution of India and Panchayati raj (India).

References

Villages in Basti district